Dazhou Heshi Airport  was an airport serving Dazhou, Sichuan province, China, formerly called Daxian Airport. The airport is closed on May 18, 2022 and replaced by Dazhou Jinya Airport.

History 
The airport was opened in 1940 as Heshiba Airport. In 1949 it was expanded to be used for civil aviation and renamed to Heshi Airport. In 2019 the airport handled 571,290 passengers and 1369 tons of mail and cargo.

See also
List of airports in China

References

Airports in Sichuan
Defunct airports in China